Wonboyn may refer to:
 Wonboyn, New South Wales, a village in New South Wales, Australia
 Wonboyn Lake, a tidal lake in New South Wales, Australia
 Wonboyn River, a barrier estuary or perennial stream in New South Wales, Australia